Fortune 1458 was a radio station based in Trafford Park, Manchester, England.

History

The station began broadcasting in 1994 on the old BBC Radio Manchester medium wave frequency. It was seen as a direct competitor to Piccadilly 1152 as the station focussed on older listeners by broadcasting an easy listening format.

Following take overs, the station went through several name changes including Lite 1458, Big AM and Capital Gold. The frequency is currently used by Gold.

Presenters

Robin Ross
Becky Want
David James
Christopher Aloysius Ashley
Colin Slade
Andy Grahamme
Dave Cash
Jonathan Dean
Samantha Kenny
Mark Peers
Phil Wood
Paul Fairclough
Susie Mathis
Pete Reeves
Josette Lesser

Spencer Evans
Bruce Edwards
Ben Weston
Simon Wynne
Fred Eyre
Ian Shepherd
Mark Cosgrove
Martin Emery
Richard Killick
Fred Fielder
Richard Duncan
Peter Fairhead
Spencer Evans
James H Reeve
Tommy Docherty
Fiona Sinclair
Jo Blakeway
Chris Oxlade
Michelle Lineker

References

External links
 Radio Authority renews 1458 Big AM's Manchester Licence
 Transmitter Coverage Information
 Gold website

Defunct radio stations in the United Kingdom
Radio stations in Manchester
Radio stations established in 1994
1994 establishments in England